Libo County is a county of southern Guizhou province, China, bordering Guangxi to the south. It is under the administration of the Qiannan Buyei and Miao Autonomous Prefecture.

Geography
The county is located in the remote southeastern corner of the prefecture, on the border with Guangxi. Two local sites, Xiaoqikong and Dongduo, notable for their spectacular karst formations, form part of the multi-site South China Karst UNESCO World Heritage Site inscribed in 2007, which is an area about 550,000 km2 in extent.

Languages
Southwestern Mandarin, Mak, Ai-Cham, Bouyei, Sui, and Numao are spoken in Libo County. Sui is spoken primarily in Shuiyao Ethnic Shui Township 水尧水族乡.

Transportation
The Libo Airport, opened in late 2007, has capacity to receive planes of the Boeing 737 class, and to handle up to  220,000 passengers annually. However, the $57-million facility is rather underutilized so far. According to the Civil Aviation Administration of China (CAAC) statistics, 151 paying passengers flew into or out of the airport in 2009 - which was a 98% drop compared to the previous year (7886 passengers), and placed the airport the last in list of the nation's 166 airports by traffic volume. Currently 4 airlines use the airport.

Flora
The karst environments in Libo County consist of the following types of forests.
Warm coniferous forest
Pinus kwangtungensis forest
Warm needle and broad-leaved mixed forest
Pseudotsuga sinensis, Platycarya longipes mixed forest
Pseudotsuga sinensis, Pinus kwangtungensis, Quercus phillyraeoides mixed forest
Evergreen and deciduous broad-leaved mixed forest
Cyclobalanopsis glauca, Platycarya longipes mixed forest
Platycarya longipes, Phellodendron amurense mixed forest
Platycarya longipes, Viburnum mixed forest
Handeliodendron bodinieri, Acer mixed forest
Viburnum, Schefflera octophylla mixed forest
Sterculiaceae, Cyclobalanopsis glauca mixed forest
Taxus cuspidata, Lindera mixed forest
Koelreuteria paniculata, Aceraceae mixed forest
Castanopsis fargesii, Elaeocarpaceae mixed forest
Big-cluster bamboo forest
Dendrocalamus tsiangii forest

Common angiosperm genera include Beilschmiedia, Cryptocarya, Casearia, Diospyros, Pittosporum, Acer, Carpinus, Ulmus, Viburnum, Prunus, and Rosa. Protected wild plants in Libo County include Handeliodendron bodinieri, Mussaenda anomala, Taxus chinensis, Paphiopedilum emersonii, Paphiopedilum barbigerum and Paphiopedilum micranthum, Pinus kwangtungensis, Pseudotsuga sinensis, Pseudotsuga brevifolia, Calocedrus macrolepis, Tetrathyrium subcordatum, Trachycarpus nana, Emmenopterys henryi, Liriodendron chinense.

Climate

References

County-level divisions of Guizhou
Qiannan Buyei and Miao Autonomous Prefecture
Rock formations of China